Education in the Federated States of Micronesia is required for citizens aged 6 to 13, and is important to their economy. The literacy rate for citizens aged 15 to 24 is 98.8%.

The national education agency is the FSM Department of Education. Each state has its own education agency operating public schools.
 Chuuk Department of Education
 Kosrae Department of Education
 Pohnpei Department of Education
 Yap Department of Education

College of Micronesia is the tertiary institution.

History
Before foreign influence, education in Micronesia was rarely distinguished from everyday life experiences and learning opportunities. Spanish influence during the 17th century changed the Micronesian learning experience to what happened at schools. This system was also influenced by German influence starting in 1899. The Japanese brought their strict model of education to Micronesia in 1914. Following World War II, the United States brought their own model of education to Micronesia.

See also 

 Rose Mackwelung

References